The Grey Cup is the championship of the Canadian Football League (CFL) and the trophy awarded to the victorious team. The trophy is named after Albert Grey, the Governor General of Canada from 1904 until 1911. He donated the trophy to the Canadian Rugby Union in 1909 to recognize the top amateur rugby football team in Canada. By this time Canadian football had become markedly different from the rugby football from which it developed. Although it was originally intended to be awarded only to amateur teams (like the Stanley Cup), over time, the Grey Cup became the property of the Canadian Football League as it evolved into a professional football league. Amateur teams ceased competing for the Cup by 1954; since 1965, the top amateur teams, playing in U Sports, have competed for the Vanier Cup.

The Grey Cup game is Canada's largest annual sports and television event, regularly drawing a Canadian viewing audience of about 4 million. Two awards are given for play in the game, Most Valuable Player and the Dick Suderman Trophy as most valuable Canadian player.  As a member of the Winnipeg Blue Bombers, Andrew Harris is the only player to win both the Dick Suderman Trophy and the Grey Cup Most Valuable Player the same year, which he did in 2019.

The Winnipeg Blue Bombers have made the most appearances (26), while the Toronto Argonauts have won the most championships (18) and have the best record in the Grey Cup composite standings (18-6).  Despite the CFL's short-lived U.S. expansion in the mid-1990s, the Grey Cup has never been played outside of Canada. The Baltimore Stallions were the only American team to appear in the Grey Cup (twice, losing in 1994 and winning the following year).

Although the first Grey Cup game was in 1909, none were played from 1916 to 1919 or in 2020, so the 109th Grey Cup game was the one played on November 20, 2022, at Mosaic Stadium in Regina, Saskatchewan. The reigning Winnipeg Blue Bombers were defeated by the Toronto Argonauts.

Results
Numbers in parentheses indicate the cumulative number of times that a team has won the Grey Cup or that a city/venue has hosted the game.

Win/Loss records
Although the official website of the Hamilton Tiger-Cats considers them as the same team, the Tiger-Cats, Hamilton Alerts, Hamilton Tigers and Hamilton Flying Wildcats are all listed separately because, when the latter three were active, the teams competed as separate franchises. The Tigers and Flying Wildcats merged in 1950 to create the Tiger-Cats.

Toronto is the city with the most wins, 25, followed by Hamilton (15), Edmonton (14), Winnipeg (12), Ottawa (10), Montreal (9), Calgary (8), Vancouver (6), Regina (4), Kingston (3), Sarnia (2) and Baltimore (1).

Active teams

Grey Cup Records post-merger era (1958)

Defunct and amateur teams

See also
 Canadian Dominion Football Championship
 Grey Cup Most Valuable Player
 Dick Suderman Trophy (Most Valuable Canadian)
 List of Canadian Football League seasons
 List of Grey Cup-winning head coaches

References

General
 
 
 
 
 
Specific

External links

 Canadian Football League – Official website
 Grey Cup – Official website
 CBC Digital Archives – Grey Cup: The Fans and the Fanfare
 96th Grey Cup Game 2008 in Montreal
 Canadian Football Resources, includes images of souvenir programmes

Grey Cup champions
Grey Cup